Doxa Petroussa Football Club is a Greek football club, based in Petroussa, Drama.

History

• 1964.is founded Doxa Petroussas.
• 1965.fighting for the first time in the Third Amateur category of Drama.
• 1970.promoted in B Amateur category of Drama.
• 1972.promoted to First Amateur category of Drama.

Since 1972, competes in A'amateur category of Drama continuously for thirty-five (35) years with the only exception of 1996-97 season, when he competed in the league in Delta Ethniki.

External links
 https://web.archive.org/web/20131006063937/http://doxapetroussas.gr/

Football clubs in Eastern Macedonia and Thrace
Drama (regional unit)